This is a list of significant earthquakes that either had their epicentres in Morocco or had a significant impact in the country.

Seismicity in Morocco
Northern Morocco lies close to the boundary between the African Plate and the Eurasian Plate, the Azores–Gibraltar Transform Fault. This zone of right-lateral strike-slip becomes transpressional at its eastern end, with the development of large thrust faults. To the east of the Strait of Gibraltar, in the Alboran Sea the boundary becomes collisional in type. Most of the seismicity in Morocco is related to movement on that plate boundary, with the greatest seismic hazard in the north of the country close to the boundary.

Earthquakes

See also
 Geology of Morocco

References

Morocco
Morocco history-related lists
Earthquakes in Morocco
Earthquakes